Georgian art grew along with the development of the Georgian statehood, starting from the ancient kingdoms of Colchis and Iberia and flourishing in the Middle Ages during the Kingdom of Georgia. Because of Georgia's location at the intersection of continents and numerous civilizations, over the centuries the country attracted travelers, merchants, missionaries and conquerors of all kinds and creeds, all of which left marks on the country's cultural and artistic environment throughout its history. Georgian art tradition has thus experienced influences from Mesopotamian, Anatolian, Greek, Persian, Roman and Byzantine art throughout antiquity. It has further grown within the framework of Christian ecclesiastical and middle-eastern art of the Middle Ages, and ultimately it has evolved in the context of European and Russian art from the 19th century onwards.

Notable Georgian artists 

 Levan Songulashvili
 David Alexidze
 Elene Akhvlediani
 Gia Bugadze
 Gigo Gabashvili
 Irakli Gamrekeli
 Lado Gudiashvili
 Gia Gugushvili
 Levan Lagidze
 David Kakabadze
 Shalva Kikodze
 Sergo Kobuladze
 Mamuka Japharidze
 Ucha Japaridze
 Temo Javakhi
 Irakli Parjiani
 Niko Pirosmani
 Dimitri Shevardnadze
 Valerian Sidamon-Eristavi
 Oleg Timchenko
 Zurab Tsereteli
 Avto Varazi

See also
 History of Georgia
 Culture of Georgia

References

External links 

 Contemporary Georgian Art Portal - Ministry of Culture of Georgia
 Tiflis Avenue Art Center Official Website 

Georgia